Allon is a Hebrew language surname, a variant of Alon, which means "oak tree". Notable people with the surname include:

George Allon (1899–1893), British football player
Henry Allon (1818–1892), British priest
Henry Erskine Allon (1864–1897), British composer. Son of Henry Allon (1818–1892).
Joe Allon (born 1966), British football player
Tom Allon (born 1962), American newspaper publisher
Yigal Allon (1918–1980), Israeli general and politician

Fiction
Gabriel Allon, fictional character in novels by Daniel Silva
Gim Allon, fictional character in the DC Comics universe 
Yera Allon, fictional character in the DC Comics universe

See also

Allon (disambiguation)

Hebrew-language surnames